GZI may refer to:
 Gazi language
 Ghazni Airport, in Afghanistan
 Ghjrazai railway station, in Pakistan
 Ground Zero Indicator
 Main Directorate of Information of the Polish Army